The 2016 Sultan of Johor Cup was the sixth edition of the Sultan of Johor Cup. It was held in Johor Bahru, Johor, Malaysia from 31 October – 6 November 2016.

As in previous editions, a total of six teams competed for the title. Defending champions Great Britain, as well as Argentina and India who also competed previously, were absent from the tournament. The teams were replaced by England, Japan and New Zealand.

Australia won the tournament for the first time by defeating Pakistan 3–1 in the final. Japan won the bronze medal by defeating England 4–1 in a penalty shoot-out following a 2–2 draw.

Participating nations
Including the host nation, 6 teams competed in the tournament. Defending champions, Great Britain, were absent from the tournament.

 (host nation)

Umpires
A total of eight umpires were appointed by the FIH to officiate the tournament.

 Andres Ortiz (ESP)
 Michiel Otten (NED)
 Nick Bennett (ENG)
 Lee Erskine (NZL)
 Yasir Khurshid (PAK)
 Hideyuki Takahashi (JPN)
 James Unkles (AUS)
 Rais Zakaria (MAS)

Results
All times are local; Malaysia Standard Time (UTC+08:00).

Preliminary round

Fixtures

Classification round

Fifth and sixth place

Third and fourth place

Final

Statistics

Final standings

Goalscorers

References

External links
Official website

Sultan of Johor Cup
2016 Sultan of Johor Cup
November 2016 sports events in Asia
Sultan of Johor Cup